Dwarf ale glasses are small drinking glasses glasses with a short stem.  In use for over 150 years, they were made for drinking ale, which was typically stronger during Georgian times.

Purpose and appearance 
Drinking glasses reserved for one particular alcoholic drink is a relatively modern concept; dwarf ale glasses would have undoubtedly been used for other beverages in addition to ale. By modern standards, they may seem small when compared to tankards and contemporary pint glasses. In a historical context, however, the capacity of drinking vessels was in proportion to the strength of their intended beverage, with small glasses reserved for strong alcoholic beverages. In recent years, there have been significant changes in this regard. This is best exemplified by the sevenfold increase in wine glass capacity over the last 300 years.

Dwarf ale glasses are characterized by the presence of a funnel (or rounded funnel) bowl with a short, rudimentary or vestigial stem. They are typically 125 mm in height and hold around 100 mL of liquid. There are many exceptions to this rule, though.

Owing to the large time period in which they were produced, dwarf ale glasses are varied in their appearance. A common form is the wrythen (twisted) dwarf ale glass, which is encountered with tight or wide wrythening on the bowl. In addition, the wrythen-moulding can extend from the bowl to the stem of the glass or be limited to half of the bowl. A rare type is the flammiform (flame-like gadrooning) dwarf ale glass, which was popular at the turn of the 18th century. Other forms are frequently found engraved with hop cone and barley ear motifs. Early glasses are often adorned with a conical folded foot, but this is not necessarily a prerequisite of age. Moreover, some 19th century glasses possess a folded foot.

Age and dating 
The glasses were made and used from the late 17th century into the 19th century.

Determining the age dwarf ale glasses is challenging due to them being manufactured throughout the 18th century and into the 19th in high numbers. Some dwarf ale glasses can in fact be reliably dated as early examples: In particular, those possessing winged or propeller knops can be attributed to the late 17th and early 18th century. Dwarf ale glasses with gadrooned wrythening, including those with a flammiform fringe, are often dated as early to mid-18th century. However, some flammifrom glasses were made throughout the 18th century.

Use in society 

Strong ales and beer were socially important during most of the Georgian period. During this time, ale was notably stronger (7-10% ABV) than it is today and akin to modern day barley wines. Because of high sediment content it was typically decanted into small glasses. Indeed, one can gauge the popularity of dwarf ale glasses by the high number and variety that have been preserved to the present day.

Unfortunately, no contemporaneous drawings, paintings or engravings unambiguously demonstrate their use in society (see the works of William Hogarth which show scenes of alcohol consumption during the 18th century).

With the invention of photography in the 19th century, it was possible to gain an accurate insight into the drinking practices within taverns. Indeed, the photograph by Hill & Adamson shows three gentlemen sharing a bottle of strong ale. As can clearly be seen on the table, ale flutes are bring used. The ale flutes in question are similar in form and capacity, albeit with a slightly elongated bowl and stem, to dwarf ale glasses. This photograph gives a brief window through time into the past tradition of consuming strong ale in small glasses.

See also 

 Beer glassware
 Heavy baluster glass

References 

Beer glassware
Drinking glasses